This list is of the Historic Sites of Japan located within the Prefecture of Nara.

National Historic Sites
As of 17 June 2022, one hundred and twenty-seven Sites have been designated as being of national significance (including ten *Special Historic Sites); Ishinokarato Kofun and Nara-yama Tile Kiln Site span the prefectural borders with Kyoto, Ōmine Okugakemichi those with Wakayama, and Kumano Sankeimichi those with both Wakayama and Mie. Many are inscribed on the UNESCO World Heritage List as component sites of the Historic Monuments of Ancient Nara, Buddhist Monuments in the Hōryū-ji Area or Sacred Sites and Pilgrimage Routes in the Kii Mountain Range; others have been proposed for future inscription as part of Asuka-Fujiwara: Archaeological sites of Japan’s Ancient Capitals and Related Properties.

|-
| align="center"|Kōriyama Castle SiteKōriyama-jō ato || Yamatokōriyama || ||  ||  || || 
|-
|}

Prefectural Historic Sites
As of 1 May 2021, fifty-four Sites have been designated as being of prefectural importance.

Municipal Historic Sites
As of 1 May 2021, a further fifty-two Sites have been designated as being of municipal importance.

See also

 Cultural Properties of Japan
 Yamato Province
 List of Places of Scenic Beauty of Japan (Nara)
 List of Cultural Properties of Japan - paintings (Nara)
 List of Cultural Properties of Japan - historical materials (Nara)
 List of Cultural Properties of Japan - archaeological materials (Nara)
 Nara National Museum

References

External links
  Cultural Properties in Nara Prefecture

Nara Prefecture
 Nara